The P-70 Ametist (NATO reporting name: SS-N-7 Starbright, GRAU designation 4K66;  'Amethyst') was an anti-ship missile carried by Soviet and Indian Project 670 submarines, as well as the Soviet Project 661 Anchar. It was soon succeeded by the P-120 Malakhit (SS-N-9 'Siren').

Fielded on June 3 1968, it was the first missile system in the world to be launched from a submerged submarine. From 1968 to 1987, a total of 631 missiles were built.

Development
The P-5 Pyatyorka (SS-N-3 Shaddock) missile required the Project 659 submarines carrying them to spend 30 minutes or more on the surface when firing. This made submarines very vulnerable to enemy attack, so in the 1960s the Soviets started work on a new missile that could be fired whilst submerged, and a submarine to carry it. These became the P-120 Malakhit and Project 670 submarine.

However, problems with the engines of the P-120 Malakhit forced the Soviets to design a sub-launched missile based on the P-15M Termit (SS-N-2C 'Styx') as a stopgap measure for the first batch of Charlie submarines.  This became the P-20L, later renamed the P-70 Ametist.

Design
The P-15M was fitted with an L band active radar homing sensor and a new radar altimeter both developed for the P-120, but there was no room for a datalink in the smaller P-15M.

The short range of the P-70 meant it did not need mid-course updates from a radar on the submarine, so it could be fired submerged. This more than made up for its lack of range compared to the P-5.

Operational history
The P-70 went into service with the Soviet Navy on the first Project 670, on June 3, 1968. About 200 were produced.

India leased the Chakra, a Soviet Project 670 submarine from January 1988 to 1992, to gain experience of operating a nuclear submarine.

Operators

References 

P-070
Cold War anti-ship cruise missiles of the Soviet Union
P-070
Cruise missiles of the Cold War
Nuclear missiles of the Cold War
P-070
P-070
Cruise missiles of Russia
Submarine-launched cruise missiles of Russia
NPO Mashinostroyeniya products
Military equipment introduced in the 1960s